The 27th Saturn Awards, honoring the best in science fiction, fantasy and horror film and television in 2000, were held on June 12, 2001 at the Park Hyatt Hotel in Century City, Los Angeles.

Below is a complete list of nominees and winners. Winners are highlighted in bold.

Winners and nominees

Film

Television

Programs

Acting

Special awards

George Pal Memorial Award
 Sam Raimi

Life Career Award
 Brian Grazer
 Robert Englund

President's Award
 Dustin Lance Black (for the direction of the documentary My Life with Count Dracula)

Service Award
 Bob Burns III (for his efforts to house and restore props from classic genre films)

Special Award
 Shadow of the Vampire (for its behind-the-scenes take on director F. W. Murnau's classic vampire movie Nosferatu, eine Symphonie des Grauens)

References

External links
 2001 Awards at IMDb
 The Official Saturn Awards Site

Saturn Awards ceremonies
2000 television awards
2000 film awards